Attilio Pavesi (1 October 1910 – 2 August 2011) was an Italian cyclist who won the individual and team road races at the 1932 Summer Olympics. The same year he placed second in the Giro di Sicilia, and in 1933–35 rode as professional, but with no success.

Pavesi was the 11th child in an affluent family in Caorso, Emilia-Romagna.  At the beginning of World War II he immigrated to San Miguel, Buenos Aires, Argentina, where he continued racing, ran his bike shop, and organized cycling races. He died at the age of 100 in a retirement home in Buenos Aires. At the time of his death he was thought to be the oldest surviving Olympic champion  and one of the oldest living Olympic competitors.

References

External links

 
 

1910 births
2011 deaths
Italian male cyclists
Olympic gold medalists for Italy
Olympic cyclists of Italy
Olympic medalists in cycling
Cyclists at the 1932 Summer Olympics
Medalists at the 1932 Summer Olympics
Cyclists from Emilia-Romagna
Sportspeople from the Province of Piacenza
Italian centenarians
Men centenarians